Albanian Affairs Party (in Albanian: Partia e Çështjeve Shqiptare) is a political party in Albania, led by Bujar Shurdhi.

References 

Political parties in Albania